Sarenjelak (also Romanized as Serenjelak; also known as Sar Anjīlak) is a village in Doshman Ziari Rural District, Doshman Ziari District, Mamasani County, Fars Province, Iran. At the 2006 census, its population was 360, in 109 families.

References 

Populated places in Mamasani County